Nobody but You may refer to:

Music

Albums
 Nobody but You, 1966 album by Camille Bob
 Nobody but You, 1976 album by Jackie Wilson
 Nobody but You, 1979 album by Charlie Rich
 Nobody but You, 1988 album by John P. Hammond
 Nobody but You, 1996 album by Slim & the Supreme Angels

Songs
 "Nobody but You" (Don Williams song), 1983
 "Nobody but You" (Cesár Sampson song), 2018
 "Nobody but You" (Blake Shelton song), 2019
 "Nobody but You", 1919 song by Arthur J. Jackson and Buddy DeSylva from the musical La La Lucille
 "Nobody but You", 1929 song by Cliff Edwards from the film The Hollywood Revue of 1929
 "Nobody but You", 1957 song by Little Walter
 "Nobody but You", 1958 song by Dee Clark
 "Nobody but You", 1958 song by Mamie Van Doren
 "Nobody but You", 1962 song by Etta James from the album Etta James, written by Willie Dixon
 "Nobody but You", 1962 song by Marty Balin
 "Nobody but You", 1965 song by Golden Earrings from the album Just Ear-rings
 "Nobody but You", 1965 song by Neil Sedaka from the album Neil Sedaka: The '50s and '60s
 "Nobody but You", 1965 song by The Temptations from the album The Temptin' Temptations
 "Nobody but You", 1965 song by The Tokens
 "Nobody but You", 1966 song by Camille Bob
 "Nobody but You", 1969 song by Perry Como from the album Seattle
 "Nobody but You", 1969 song by The Buckaroos
 "Nobody but You", 1971 song by Loggins and Messina from the album Sittin' In
 "Nobody but You", 1972 song by James Taylor from the album One Man Dog
 "Nobody but You", 1976 song by Gladys Knight & the Pips
 "Nobody but You", 1976 song by Jackie Wilson
 "Nobody but You", 1982 song by J. J. Cale from the album Grasshopper
 "Nobody but You", 1983 song by Curtis Mayfield from the album Honesty
 "Nobody but You", 1985 song by Juicy
 "Nobody but You", 1990 song by Lou Reed and John Cale from the album Songs for Drella
 "Nobody but You", 1992 song by James Blood Ulmer from the album Blues Preacher
 "Nobody but You", 1993 song by The Hooters from the album Out of Body
 "Nobody but You", 1994 song by Elkie Brooks from the album Nothin' but the Blues, co-written by Willie Dixon and Bessie Smith
 "Nobody but You", 1994 song by Robert Palmer from the album Honey
 "Nobody but You", 1996 song by Backstreet Boys from the album Backstreet Boys
 "Nobody but You", 1994 song by Michael Feinstein from the album Michael & George: Feinstein Sings Gershwin, written by Arthur J. Jackson and Buddy DeSylva from the musical La La Lucille
 "Nobody but You", 2002 song by BoA from the album Listen to My Heart
 "Nobody but You", 2003 song by Little Brother from the album The Listening
 "Nobody but You", 2005 song by Al Green from the album Everything's OK
 "Nobody but You", 2005 song by Girls Aloud, B-side to the single "Biology"
 "Nobody but You", 2006 song by Crystal Kay from the album Call Me Miss...
 "Nobody but You", 2006 song by The Black Keys from the EP Chulahoma: The Songs of Junior Kimbrough, written by Junior Kimbrough
 "Nobody but You", 2008 song by Cassie
 "Nobody but You", 2010 song by The Apples in Stereo from the album Travellers in Space and Time
 "Nobody but You", 2012 song by Serena Ryder from the album Harmony
 "Nobody but You", 2013 song by Algebra
 "Nobody but You", 2013 song by Wizkid
 "Nobody but You", 2014 song by Kimbra from the album The Golden Echo
 "Nobody but You", 2014 song by Mary J. Blige from the album The London Sessions
 "Nobody but You", 2015 song by Bastarz from the EP Conduct Zero
 "Nobody but You", 2015 song by Gloriana from the album Three
 "Nobody but You", 2016 song by Charles Bradley from the album Changes

Other uses 
 Nobody but You, 2009 novel by Francis Ray in the Grayson Friends series

See also 
 "Nobody", a song by Wonder Girls with the catchphrase
 Tú o nadie (English: You or no one / No one but you), a 1985 Mexican telenovela
 "I Don't Want to Be with Nobody but You", 1990 song by Australian group Absent Friends
 Nobody but Me (disambiguation)